Marmaronchis vaigiensis is a species of air-breathing sea slug, a shell-less marine pulmonate gastropod mollusk in the family Onchidiidae.

Description

Distribution

References

 Semper, C. (1870-1885). Reisen im Archipel der Philippinen, Theil 2. Wissenschaftliche Resultate. Band 3, Landmollusken. Wiesbaden: Kreidel.

External links
 Quoy, J. R. C.; Gaimard, J. P. (1824-1826). Zoologie. In: L. de Freycinet (ed.), Voyage au tour du monde fait par ordre du roi, sur les corvettes de S. M: l'Uranie et la Physicienne pendant les années 1817 à 1820. iv + 712 pp
 Semper, C. (1870-1885). Reisen im Archipel der Philippinen, Theil 2. Wissenschaftliche Resultate. Band 3, Landmollusken. Wiesbaden: Kreidel
 Dayrat B., Goulding T.C., Khalil M., Lozouet P. & Tan S.H. (2018). Systematic revision one clade at a time: A new genus of onchidiid slugs from the Indo-West Pacific (Gastropoda: Euthyneura: Pulmonata). Raffles Bulletin of Zoology. 66: 814-837

Onchidiidae
Gastropods described in 1885